Karl-August Fagerholm's second cabinet was the 40th government of Republic of Finland. Cabinet's time period was from March 3, 1956 to May 27, 1957. It was Majority government.

 

Fagerholm, 2
1956 establishments in Finland
1957 disestablishments in Finland
Cabinets established in 1956
Cabinets disestablished in 1957